Changing Places (1975) is the first "campus novel" by British novelist David Lodge. The subtitle is "A Tale of Two Campuses", and thus both the title and subtitle are literary allusions to Charles Dickens' A Tale of Two Cities. It is the first novel, followed by Small World (1984) and Nice Work (1988).

Synopsis
Changing Places is a comic novel with serious undercurrents. It tells the story of the six-month academic exchange programme between fictional universities located in Rummidge (modelled on Birmingham in England) and Plotinus, in the state of Euphoria (modeled on Berkeley in California).  The two academics taking part in the exchange are both aged 40, but appear at first to otherwise have little in common, mainly because of the differing academic systems of their native countries.

The English participant, Philip Swallow, is a very conventional and conformist British academic, and somewhat in awe of the American way of life.  By contrast the American, Morris Zapp, is a top-ranking American professor who only agrees to go to Rummidge because his wife agrees to postpone long-threatened divorce proceedings on condition that he move out of the marital home for six months.  Zapp is at first both contemptuous of, and amused by, what he perceives as the amateurism of British academe.

As the exchange progresses, Swallow and Zapp find that they begin to fit in surprisingly well to their new environments.  In the course of the story, each man has an affair with the other's wife.  Before that, Swallow sleeps with Zapp's daughter Melanie, without realising who she is.  She takes up with a former undergraduate student of his, Charles Boon.

Swallow and Zapp even consider remaining permanently.  The book ends with the two couples convened in a New York hotel room to decide their fates.  The novel ends without a clear-cut decision, though the sequel Small World: An Academic Romance, reveals that Swallow and Zapp returned to their home countries and domestic situations.

Biographical basis
David Lodge has stated that the character of Morris Zapp was inspired by the literary critic Stanley Fish.

References
Footnotes

External links
 British Council biography of David Lodge with discussion of Changing Places

1975 British novels
Novels by David Lodge
Campus novels
Novels set in Birmingham, West Midlands
Novels set in California
Secker & Warburg books
Hawthornden Prize-winning works